Doonies Rare Breeds Farm, Aberdeen, has one of Scotland's largest collections of rare and endangered farm animal breeds. The farm occupies 134 acres and is nationally recognised as a breeding centre for rare breeds. There are 23 rare animal breeds on the farm, such as pigs, cattle, sheep, horses, chickens and ducks. During the Easter time of year, new arrivals can be seen such as lambs, calves, chicks and foals.

Doonies farm stands on the coast, just past the old fishing village of Cove in Aberdeen, Scotland. 

Doonies farm is operated as a family-run business; however, the farm used to be owned and operated by Aberdeen City Council for roughly 20 years. Although it is run as a working farm, it is open to the public. Due to council cutbacks it was earmarked for closure in the summer of 2008; however, there have been many petitions and protests to persuade the council to save Doonies, and an agreement may still be reached.

References

External links 

Official Webpage
Doonies Farm unofficial Myspace
North Sea Trail
BBC h2g2 Article
Aboutaberdeen review and photographs of Doonie Farm

Environment of Aberdeenshire
Organisations based in Aberdeen
Tourist attractions in Aberdeen